Reverse smoking is a kind of smoking where the burnt end of a hand rolled tobacco leaf is put in the mouth rather than the unlit end of the cigar. It is practiced in some parts of Andhra Pradesh, India, Lusaka, Zambia and the Philippines. Reverse smoking is considered to be a risk factor for oral cancer.

References

Smoking
Habits
Drug delivery devices
Dosage forms
Drug culture